Leucopogon microphyllus is a small Australian plant in the family Ericaceae native to eastern Australia. Two varieties are recognised, distinguished principally by leaf hairiness and geographical distribution. Leucopogon microphyllus var. microphyllus (Cav.) R.Br. is widespread and relatively common in heathlands of coastal eastern New South Wales and south eastern Queensland. Leucopogon microphyllus var. pilibundus (A.Cunn. ex DC.) Benth. is found at higher altitudes on the eastern ranges of New South Wales and Victoria, and has leaves with long hairs on both the upper and lower surface. Neither variety is considered threatened.

References

microphyllus
Ericales of Australia
Flora of New South Wales
Flora of Victoria (Australia)
Flora of Queensland
Plants described in 1810
Taxa named by Robert Brown (botanist, born 1773)
Taxa named by Antonio José Cavanilles